George "Pee Wee" Erwin (May 30, 1913 – June 20, 1981) was an American jazz trumpeter.

Biography
He was born in Falls City, Nebraska, United States. Erwin started on trumpet at age four. He played in several territory bands before joining the groups of Joe Haymes (1931–33) and Isham Jones (1933–34). He then moved to New York City, where he was prolific as a studio musician, performing on radio and in recording sessions. He played with Benny Goodman in 1934-35, then with Ray Noble in 1935; the next year he rejoined Goodman, taking Bunny Berigan's empty chair. In 1937, he again followed Berigan, this time in Tommy Dorsey's orchestra, where he remained until 1939.

Erwin led his own big band in 1941-42 and 1946. In the 1950s, he settled in New Milford, New Jersey, and played Dixieland jazz in New Orleans, and in the 1960s formed his own trumpet school with Chris Griffin; among its graduates was Warren Vaché. Erwin played up until the year of his death, recording as a leader for United Artists in the 1950s and issuing six albums in 1980 and 1981, the last two years of his life.

In May 1981, Erwin performed at the Breda Jazz Festival in the Netherlands, weeks before his death in Teaneck, New Jersey, at the age of 68.

Discography
1953: The Land of Dixie (Brunswick)
1955: Accent on Dixieland (Urania)
1956: Dixieland at Grandview Inn (Cadence)
1958: Oh, Play That Thing! (United Artists)
1959: Down by the Riverside (United Artists)
1980: In New York (Qualtro)
1980: Swingin' That Music (Jazzology)
1980: Pee Wee in Hollywood (Qualtro)
1990: Dixieland Ramble (Broadway Intermission) – contains radio transcriptions probably from the 1950s and a 1965 live session)
2000: Dr. Jazz (Storyville) – with Vic Dickenson, all tracks recorded in 1952

References

Further reading
 Erwin, P. W. (1987) This Horn for Hire. The Scarecrow Press, Inc.,

External links
 Pee Wee Erwin: Complete Fifties Recordings. A complete listing on the Worlds Records website.

1913 births
1981 deaths
American jazz trumpeters
American male trumpeters
People from New Milford, New Jersey
20th-century American musicians
20th-century trumpeters
People from Falls City, Nebraska
Jazz musicians from Nebraska
20th-century American male musicians
American male jazz musicians